Masternaut Limited is a telematics company specialising in fleet and asset management. They achieved initial recognition with Martin Port as CEO and subsequently with Martin Hiscox as Chairman were featured as a 2015 UK Government Future 50 Tech Company and in the Sunday Times Tech Track 100, a list of the fastest growing UK technology firms, in 2007, 2008, 2009, 2010 and 2014. In April 2011 Masternaut merged with former AIM-listed competitor Cybit, and is operating under the Masternaut name. The company is owned by Summit Partners and Fleetcor, following its acquisition from Francisco Partners in 2014. and are now owned by Michelin. Masternaut has around 400 employees, based in the UK and France.

History
Masternaut was founded in 1996 by Serge Deleau in France under the name SDM. In 2012, the company rebranded to Masternaut under Martin Hiscox with the backing of Francisco Partners. In 2013, Masternaut acquired Three X, a mobile workforce software business, from GE.

Previously a Masternaut competitor, AIM-listed Cybit, led by CEO Richard Horsman, acquired Thales Telematics from Thales Group and public sector telematics specialist Amatics in 2007. Cybit made a further acquisition in 2008 of Truck24, a German Telematics Logistics provider, for €4 million. In 2009, private equity firm Francisco Partners acquired Cybit Holdings plc in a £23 million deal, taking the company private. Cybit also acquired Oxloc, a specialist non-powered asset tracking devices provider, that year. Meanwhile, Masternaut was on the acquisition trail, signing hosting and data store company Fibre-City for £6 million.

In 2011, Bill Henry as CEO with Martin Hiscox as Chairman with the backing of Francisco Partners Private Equity merged Masternaut with Cybit in a £100m deal to create Europe's largest telematics solutions provider, with a 10,000-strong customer base spread across 32 countries. However, Berg Insight reported that this position was lost in 2015 to Tom as new business growth faltered. The Berg report for 2016 indicates Masternaut continues to lose market share to key competitors. Masternaut remains the largest telematics provider in the UK, and as part of the FleetCor family, is one of the largest fleet suppliers in the UK covering a fleet's total cost of ownership needs.

Masternaut signed a partnership with Telefonica in 2012, estimated to be worth $910 million between 2012 and 2020. Masternaut also has partnerships with SwissCom and with many specialist fleet providers.

In 2014, Masternaut Group Holdings was sold by Martin Hiscox then Chairman and CEO and Francisco Partners to Summit Partners and Fleetcor Technologies for an undisclosed sum. The company appointed Dhruv S. Parekh as CEO of Masternaut in 2015.

Masternaut Connect, the next generation of the company's enterprise-grade SaaS platform, launched and grew at 25-30% per annum. Their product range expanded with a driver mobile application, a specialised cold chain solution and a plug-and-play telematics device. Partnerships for factory-fit telematics (Vauxhall, PSA, Renault) and for pre-equipped leased/hired vehicles (Fraikin, Petit Forestier, Lex) have improved overall access to telematics. As a result, surveys revealed an improvement of +50 in Masternaut's global NPS (Net Promoter Score) between 2017 and early 2019.

In 2018, Masternaut underwent a company rebranding, including a new logo and a new proposition: the unseen advantage, emphasising Masternaut's supposed ability to "help companies leverage fleet data to optimise costs and transform business operations". The creation of a data science team, able to provide bespoke deep analysis from customer and global trends, was a key part of this transition.

Michelin acquired Masternaut in 2019 making it their third major acquisition in fleet telematics. With the other acquisitions in North America and South America, Masternaut gives Michelin access to the European market.

Technology
Masternaut offers many telematics services that use many different technologies. These services use Global Positioning System (GPS) technology to track vehicle or asset locations, which are then transmitted via GPRS and GSM mobile networks to Masternaut's data centres and  Masternaut Connect, their software platform. Customers are able to view their fleet's data instantly.

CAN, OBD, and 12V cigarette lighter port 
Masternaut are able to connect fleets in different ways (CAN bus, OBD port and cigarette lighter), that can be integrated as part of a mixed fleet service. Masternaut's patented CAN clip provides the most real-time data and is less intrusive, whereas the OBD-II device is typically easier to install. The third option is a device that plugs into a vehicle's cigarette lighter (12V outlet), making it easy to plug/unplug and deliver obvious driver privacy.

References 

British companies established in 1996
Companies based in London
Technology companies of the United Kingdom
2019 mergers and acquisitions
Michelin